USCGC Dauntless (WMEC-624) is a United States Coast Guard medium endurance cutter, commissioned in 1968 and still on active duty.

She is the first cutter in Coast Guard history to hold this name.  Like all ships in the Reliance class of 210-foot medium-endurance cutters, Dauntless is named for an aspirational trait, in this case meaning to "persevere fearlessly."  This trait is further reflected in the ship's motto Sin Miedo which, in Spanish, means "Without Fear."

Construction and career 
Dauntless was laid down on 15 May 1965 and launched on 21 October 1967 by American Ship Building Company. Commissioned on 10 June 1968.

Since her commissioning, Dauntless was homeported in Miami, Florida, until 1993, when she was decommissioned and entered Major Maintenance Availability (MMA) at the Coast Guard Yard in Curtis Bay, Maryland.  After 18 months and at a total cost of $21 million, the ship was completely overhauled from stem to stern.  The major renovations included the addition of an engine exhaust stack aft of the pilot house, a complete powerplant overhaul, installation of new navigation and communications systems, and extensive habitability improvements.  After MMA, Dauntless was assigned to her new homeport of Galveston, Texas. After her overhaul, her 3”/50cal gun was put on display onboard USS Lexington Museum.

Dauntless has earned a reputation as one of the nation's premier "drug busters." Dauntless became the first cutter in history to seize one million pounds of marijuana, an accomplishment signified by a large gold marijuana leaf painted on her superstructure.  During her Coast Guard career, Dauntless has over 85 illegal narcotics "busts" to her credit, more than any other cutter.

She has also played a leading role in search and rescue (SAR) operations.  During the mass Cuban exodus (see Mariel boatlift) between April 23 and May 13, 1980, over 25 vessels were towed to safety, eight persons adrift at sea were rescued, and an astonishing 55 SAR cases were conducted.

President Ronald Reagan visited the cutter on November 17, 1982 and awarded her the Coast Guard Unit Commendation.  It was the first time in 19 years that a President visited a Coast Guard cutter.

The ship's most- publicized case occurred during January 1986, when Dauntless was first to arrive and served as on-scene commander (until relieved by USCGC Dallas) for the response to the Space Shuttle Challenger disaster.  On November 24, 1995, Dauntless rescued 578 migrants from a grossly overloaded 75-foot coastal freighter, the largest number of migrants rescued from a single vessel in Coast Guard history.

Since relocating to Galveston, Dauntless has continued performing her primary missions of law enforcement, alien migrant interdiction operations, protection of marine resources, SAR, and more recently homeland defense in the Gulf of Mexico.  Operational highlights include the four "drug busts" resulting in over 3,000 pounds of illegal drugs seized; and the September 2001 rescue of a young commercial mariner from Louisiana who had fallen overboard from the vessel on which he was working, and was successfully located and returned to his ship.  Since the events of September 11, 2001, Dauntless has conducted several patrols dedicated to enhancing port security in the Gulf of Mexico.

In July 2018, Dauntless arrived at her newly assigned homeport of Pensacola, Florida.

Awards 
The cutter's awards include the Coast Guard Unit Commendation (2), the Coast Guard Meritorious Unit Commendation (5), the Coast Guard Bicentennial Unit Commendation, the Coast Guard "E" ribbon (7), the National Defense Service Medal (3), and the Humanitarian Service Medal (3).

In fiction
Dauntless has appeared in two motion pictures: The Island, in which (portraying herself) she was boarded and seized by Caribbean pirates, and in the James Bond film Licence to Kill.

In the 2016 novel Goliath by Shawn Corridan & Gary Waid, Dauntless along with Alex Haley are the two Coast Guard cutters that respond to the fire aboard and subsequent stranding of a Russian ULCC.

Gallery

References

External links
History

Historic American Engineering Record in Texas
Ships of the United States Coast Guard
Reliance-class cutters
1967 ships
Ships built in Lorain, Ohio